The 2018 AMA National Speedway Championship Series was staged over four rounds, held at Prairie City (April 28), Ventura (June 23), Santa Maria (July 28) and Industry (August 11). It was won by Billy Janniro, who beat Luke Becker and Austin Novratil. It was the ninth title of Janniro's career, taking him clear of Greg Hancock on the all-time list, and his sixth in-a-row.

Event format 
Over the course of 20 heats, each rider races against every other rider once. The top eight scorers then reach the semi-finals, with first and second in those semi-finals reaching the final. Points are scored for every ride taken, including the semi-finals and final.

Classification

References 

AMA
United States
Speed
Speed